The Spalding Method is a means of teaching reading by focusing first on phonics and writing. It was developed by Romalda Bishop Spalding in the late 1950s as a multi-disciplinary educational tool.

References

External links
 www.spalding.org

See also
Dyslexia
List of Phonics Programs
Orton-Gillingham
Samuel Orton

Phonics curricula
Learning to read
Reading (process)
Basal readers